Just Like The River And Other Songs For Guitar is a folk album released in 2008 by Robin Williamson. The song "Through The Horned Clouds" is originally from the 1972 album Myrrh, "The Man In The Van" is from the 1978 album American Stonehenge and "Wild Horses" is from The Rolling Stones' 1971 album Sticky Fingers.

Track listing 
All songs written by Robin Williamson, except "When First To This Country" (Traditional), "Wild Horses" (Jagger/Richards) and "Absolutely Sweet Marie" (Bob Dylan).
Take A Heed Of Me Sometime
Through The Horned Clouds
Wild Horses
When First To This Country
Jordan Is A Hard Road
The Man In The Van
Matt Groves And Lady Barnard
Down In Cupid's Garden
Absolutely Sweet Marie
Just Like The River
The Silence Between The Words
Song For Bina

2008 albums
Robin Williamson albums